Dragonfly is a steel roller coaster in the Dutch amusement park Duinrell.

Information
On the front of the trains, the logo of the coaster is visible. The coaster operates a single train with two riders on each of the twelve rows, giving it a capacity of 24 people for each ride. The coaster was built by the German company Gerstlauer and was opened on 31 March 2012.

External links
 Dragonfly at duinrell.com

References 

 Info at RCDB.com

Roller coasters in the Netherlands